Tomlinson Run State Park sits on  along the small Ohio River tributary of the same name.  This state park lies near the foremost tip of the panhandle, in Hancock County. This is the only state park in West Virginia that offers overnight accommodations in a yurt.

The park features a lake and several ponds, totaling , for fishing and boating.

Features
 54 camp sites (33 with electrical hookup)
 2 Campers' Cabins (Sleep 5 and have electricity and lights) 
 4 yurts (2 sleep two persons and 2 sleep 5 persons)
 Group camp (11 cabins can host up to a 112-person group)
 Picnic area with 2 shelters (1 with limited electricity)
 Picnic shelter at miniature golf area with electricity
 Picnic shelter at swimming pool with electricity
 Swimming pool with 182-ft (55 m) water slide
 Miniature golf
 Boat rentals
 Hiking trails
 Basketball and volleyball courts
 Playground

Accessibility

Accessibility for the disabled was assessed by West Virginia University. The assessment found the park to be generally accessible. The 2005 assessment found an issue with accessibility signage.

Foundation

The Tomlinson Run State Park Foundation was established in the 1990s by citizens of Hancock County to raise funds for the improvement of the park. Over the years, foundation funding has been used for numerous park improvements including a new maintenance building, playground equipment, picnic shelters, and flag poles.

See also

 List of West Virginia state parks
 State park

References

External links
 

State parks of West Virginia
Protected areas of Hancock County, West Virginia
Protected areas established in 1935
Campgrounds in West Virginia
1935 establishments in West Virginia
IUCN Category III